Burlington Refrigerator Express (BREX) was a railroad refrigerator car leasing company that was formed on May 1, 1926 as a joint venture between the Chicago, Burlington and Quincy Railroad (CB&Q) and the Fruit Growers Express Company. The move helped the FGE expand its business into the Pacific Northwest, and added almost 2,700 ice bunker units to the existing car pool already under lease by the Burlington to the FGE and Western Fruit Express (WFE).

Burlington Refrigerator Express Roster, 1930–1970:

Source: The Great Yellow Fleet, p. 16.

References
 White, John H.  (1986).  The Great Yellow Fleet.  Golden West Books, San Marino, CA.  .

External links
 The Florida Railroad Company Inc. / The Fruit Growers Express Company  official website

Transport companies established in 1926
Refrigerator car lines of the United States
1926 establishments in Illinois